Subir Bhattacharjee (born 21 December 1957) is an Indian former cricketer. He played three first-class matches for Bengal in 1981/82.

See also
 List of Bengal cricketers

References

External links
 

1957 births
Living people
Indian cricketers
Bengal cricketers
Cricketers from Kolkata